Thomas Egerton may refer to:

Thomas Egerton (mercer) (by 1521–c. 1597), Under-Treasurer of the Royal Mint
Thomas Egerton (died 1599) (1574–1599), MP for Cheshire (UK Parliament constituency)
Thomas Egerton, 1st Viscount Brackley (1540–1617), Lord Keeper 1596–1616
Thomas Egerton, 1st Earl of Wilton (1749–1814)
Thomas Egerton, 2nd Earl of Wilton (1799–1882)
Thomas Egerton Hale, recipient of the Victoria Cross
Thomas Egerton (publisher), publisher of Jane Austen's first three books
Thomas Graham Egerton, British Army officer